Andrew Wilde is the name of:

 Andrew Wilde (pianist) (born 1965), English classical pianist
 Andrew Wilde (actor), English actor